Catherine Namugala a Zambian politician. She is the First Deputy Speaker of the Zambian Parliament. She was nominated to that position by President Edgar Lungu, on 18 September 2016. She is the former Minister of Tourism, Environment and Natural Resources in the Zambian Cabinet. She also served as the Member of Parliament (MP), representing Mafinga (previously known as Isoka East) in the Zambian Parliament from 2001 until 2016.

Work History
Catherine Namugala served as Deputy Minister of Foreign Affairs from 2002 until 2003. From 2003 until 2005, she served as the Deputy Minister for Community Development and Social Services. In 2006, she was re-elected to parliament, representing Isoka East. Also in 2006, she was appointed Minister of Community Development and Social Services. Since then, she served as Deputy Minister in the Office of the Vice President, prior to being appointed Minister of Tourism and the Environment in 2008 In February 2010, Catherine Namugala was awarded the African Tourism Minister Of The Year Award, beating six contestants from Ghana, Namibia, Sierra Leone, Tanzania, Uganda and Zimbabwe.

In the August 2016 presidential and parliamentary elections, Namugala who belongs to the Movement for Multi-Party Democracy political party, chose not to re-contest her parliamentary seat. Instead she endorsed president Lungu's re-election bid for the Patriotic Front.

Personal details
Mrs. Catherine Namugala is single. She belongs to the Movement for Multiparty Democracy (MMD), political party.

See also
 Cabinet of Zambia
 National Assembly (Zambia)

References

External links
Website of the National Assembly (Parliament) of Zambia
Climate Change - The Zambia Story
Ms. Namugala Hits Spotlight In New York

Living people
1966 births
Members of the National Assembly of Zambia
University of Zambia alumni
Movement for Multi-Party Democracy politicians
Women government ministers of Zambia
21st-century Zambian women politicians
21st-century Zambian politicians
People from Isoka District
Tourism ministers of Zambia